

461001–461100 

|-bgcolor=#f2f2f2
| colspan=4 align=center | 
|}

461101–461200 

|-bgcolor=#f2f2f2
| colspan=4 align=center | 
|}

461201–461300 

|-bgcolor=#f2f2f2
| colspan=4 align=center | 
|}

461301–461400 

|-bgcolor=#f2f2f2
| colspan=4 align=center | 
|}

461401–461500 

|-bgcolor=#f2f2f2
| colspan=4 align=center | 
|}

461501–461600 

|-bgcolor=#f2f2f2
| colspan=4 align=center | 
|}

461601–461700 

|-id=650
| 461650 Paisdezső ||  || Dezső Pais (1886–1973) was a prominent figure of Hungarian historical linguistics. His special fields were phonology, lexicology, and cultural history, the study of personal names and toponomy. He was the initiator of studies concerning the history of standard Hungarian. || 
|}

461701–461800 

|-bgcolor=#f2f2f2
| colspan=4 align=center | 
|}

461801–461900 

|-bgcolor=#f2f2f2
| colspan=4 align=center | 
|}

461901–462000 

|-id=981
| 461981 Chuyouhua ||  || You-Hua Chu (born 1953) is an astronomer, and was director of Academia Sinica's Institute of Astronomy and Astrophysics in Taiwan from 2014 to 2020. || 
|}

References 

461001-462000